Sierra Leone competed in the 2014 Commonwealth Games in Glasgow, Scotland, from 23 July to 3 August 2014.

Athletics

Men
Track & road events

Women
Track & road events

Boxing

Men

Cycling

Road
Men

Judo

Men

Squash

Individual

Doubles

Table Tennis

Singles

Doubles

Weightlifting

Men

Wrestling

Men's freestyle

References

Nations at the 2014 Commonwealth Games
Sierra Leone at the Commonwealth Games
2014 in Sierra Leonean sport